Gamlingay Village College was a middle school with academy status located in Gamlingay, Cambridgeshire, England. It was the only middle school in Cambridgeshire.

From 2012 to 2017 the school formed part of Stratton Education Trust which also includes Stratton Upper School in Biggleswade, Bedfordshire.

On 1 September 2017 the school was transferred to The Cam Academy Trust who also run Gamlingay First School, the only other school in Gamlingay.

Lionel Fanthorpe the television presenter, author and lecturer, was based at the college as a Further Education Tutor from 1967 to 1969.

External links
Official website

Defunct schools in Cambridgeshire
2017 disestablishments in England
Educational institutions disestablished in 2017